Anne Colgan is a former camogie player, captain of the All Ireland Camogie Championship winning team in 1984.

Career
Promoted to the senior team after winning junior League honours with Dublin in 1982 she played at right back. After Dublin's All Ireland victory she retired from the game, returning briefly in 1988–89.

References

External links
 Camogie.ie Official Camogie Association Website

Year of birth missing (living people)
Living people
Dublin camogie players